Patrizio Pascucci (born 25 November 1985) is an Italian former footballer who is last known to have played as a striker for Sporting Genzano.

Career

In 2002, Pascucci was sent on loan to L'Aquila in the Italian third division from the youth academy of Italian Serie A side Lazio.

In 2003, he joined the youth academy of Everton in the English Premier League, before joining Italian third division club Sora, where he received a 2-month ban for throwing a ball at a linesman.

In 2006, Pascucci signed for Baulmes in the Swiss second division before joining Italian sixth division team Boreale Don Orione.

References

External links
 Patrizio Pasucci at LazioWiki

Expatriate footballers in England
Living people
Association football forwards
Italian footballers
Italian expatriate sportspeople in England
Italian expatriate footballers
1985 births
Expatriate footballers in Switzerland
Serie C players
Italian expatriate sportspeople in Switzerland
FC Baulmes players
L'Aquila Calcio 1927 players
Swiss Challenge League players
Footballers from Rome